Ebenezer Lounsbery (c. 1787 — October 8, 1868 Kingston, Ulster County, New York) was an American politician from New York.

Life
He married Maria Hardenburgh, and they had three children.

He was a member of the New York State Senate (2nd D.) in 1836.

Sources
The New York Civil List compiled by Franklin Benjamin Hough (pages 131 and 143; Weed, Parsons and Co., 1858)

1780s births
1868 deaths
Democratic Party New York (state) state senators
Politicians from Kingston, New York
19th-century American politicians